Batman: Death in the Family is a 2020 American animated interactive short film based on alternate outcomes of the storyline of the same name. It is a spiritual sequel to Batman: Under the Red Hood and was released on Blu-ray on October 13, 2020.

Synopsis

Format
Death in the Family is an interactive film. When presented with a choice point, the user has ten seconds to make a choice or a default decision is made for them. The film has an average viewing of 95 minutes, and at least 9 alternate story paths (two paths lead to same or similar conclusion), with 7 alternate endings.

Plot
Believing that Jason Todd is becoming too aggressive in his crime-fighting, Batman decides to suspend him from his active duties as Robin; angered, Jason forsakes Batman and leaves Gotham City. The two reunite in Bosnia to fight the Joker and Ra's al Ghul, who are working together to steal uranium to create radioactive dirty bombs. As Batman stops Ra's al Ghul's men, the Joker captures Robin and brutally beats him with a crowbar, leaving him to die in a warehouse that is rigged to explode.

Robin Dies
If Robin dies, the events of Batman: Under the Red Hood play out naturally. A guilt-ridden Ra's al Ghul uses the Lazarus Pit to resurrect Jason, who becomes the Red Hood and wages a war against Batman and Black Mask, eventually leading to Black Mask releasing Joker from Arkham Asylum. Red Hood captures Joker and forces Batman to decide between killing the Joker or him. Batman manages to avoid killing either of them, but Red Hood disappears. Bruce provides a recap of the events to Clark Kent, who commends Bruce for his bravery in facing his inner demons and offers his help in finding Jason.

Robin Cheats Death
Jason survives the explosion, but is severely injured, requiring his face to be swathed in bandages. He is also severely traumatize and blames Batman for his plight. He dons a new Robin suit while keeping the bandages on his head, and becomes a violent vigilante who brutally murders several Gotham criminals, such as Cheetah, the Riddler, and Black Mask. He is eventually found by Talia al Ghul, who offers to help him find and kill the Joker in exchange for Jason agreeing to raise her and Bruce's infant son Damian. Jason agrees, secretly planning to eventually turn Damian against both of his biological parents.

Batman Saves Robin
Unlike the other two options, this version offers multiple branching paths. Batman manages to get Robin out of the warehouse, but is killed in the explosion. With his dying words, Bruce attempts to convince Jason not to take revenge on the Joker and to be strong for his family. Jason, Alfred, and Barbara Gordon put Bruce to rest next to his parents, and Dick Grayson succeeds him as Batman. The viewer then has to decide whether Jason chooses to kill the Joker.

Kill the Joker
Jason goes to a local diner and sees a news report about Batman. A man sitting next to him figures out that it's not the same Batman and is likely Nightwing pretending to be him. When prompted by Jason, the man claims to have known Batman and fought alongside him, but is now a new man and is attempting to start his life over. Reminiscing, he tells Jason a joke he once told Batman, leading Jason to realize it's the same joke from when Barbara Gordon was shot in the spine and that the man is a reforming Joker. Jason reveals his identity by repeating the parting words Joker said to him back in the warehouse, making the Joker excitedly grin in realization, before Jason stabs and kills him. Shortly afterwards, two GCPD police officers arrive to arrest Jason. The viewer then has the option to determine if he turns himself in or escapes.
 
 If Jason turns himself in, he is given a life sentence and takes on the "Jailbird" persona to serve justice on the inside.
 If Jason attacks the police and escapes, he becomes the antihero Red Robin and begins a murderous rampage against Gotham's criminals (the same ones he kills in the "Robin Cheats Death" option). Eventually, he battles Two-Face at a mall. After gaining the upper hand on Red Robin, Two-Face flips his coin to determine Red Robin's fate. The viewer can decide what side the coin lands on:
 If it lands on the good side, Two-Face decides to kill Red Robin, as he believes he would be doing Gotham a favor. Before he can do so, however, he is tased by a young Tim Drake. Tim convinces Jason to spare Two-Face by reminding him of Batman's dying words. Jason ultimately changes his ways, returns to the Bat-Family, and adopts Tim as his new sidekick Bat Kid.
 If it lands on the bad side, Two-Face decides to spare Red Robin, as he believes letting Jason live with what he has become is a fate worse than death. Sure enough, Jason is wracked with guilt and retires from crime-fighting.

Catch the Joker
Jason attempts to fulfill his promise to Bruce not to kill the criminals he fights. To attract the Joker's attention, Jason adopts his previous persona of the Red Hood and wages a bloody war on Gotham's criminal underworld. He eventually manages to bring Joker out of hiding and defeats him in a fight. The Joker is overjoyed by what Jason has become, and says that Jason is now more his successor than Batman's. Jason, who has been repressing his memories of killing criminals, suddenly realizes what he has done. The viewer can then decide once again whether Jason chooses to spare or kill the Joker.

Regardless of which option is chosen, Red Hood becomes a wanted fugitive and is pursued by the police and Dick. On top of a Wayne Industries tower one night, Jason is confronted by Talia and a revived Bruce Wayne. Talia reveals that she resurrected Bruce with the Lazarus Pit, but he was driven insane in the process and can only say "Zur-En-Arrh". She offers Jason the chance to join them in the League of Assassins, but he refuses and fights Batman. The viewer can decide whether Jason battles Batman to the death or tries to save him.

 If Red Hood fights Batman to the death, he fatally wounds Batman with his knife, leading Bruce to activate a hidden bomb that kills Jason, Talia, and himself.
 If Red Hood tries to save Batman, Jason tases Bruce and defeats Talia. Dick arrives shortly afterward and takes Bruce and Jason back to Wayne Manor. Barbara Gordon returns to crime-fighting as Dick's "Oracle" while Jason pauses to heal from the trauma. Bruce is locked in the Batcave as the Bat-Family attempts to cure him of the effects of the Lazarus Pit. Bruce remembers the last words his father spoke to him, about how a masked vigilante like Zorro wouldn't be welcome in Gotham, and that people would lock "Zorro in Arkham", with "Zur-En-Arrh" being a fragmented mantra of the phrase.

Cast
 Bruce Greenwood as Bruce Wayne / Batman
 Vincent Martella as Jason Todd / Robin / Red Robin / Red Hood / Hush
 John DiMaggio as Joker, Thomas Wayne, Reporter #2
 Zehra Fazal as Talia al Ghul, Reporter #3
 Kimberly Brooks as Police Officer #1, Reporter #1
 Nick Carson as Bruce Wayne (young), Tim Drake
 Gary Cole as Commissioner James Gordon, Two-Face, Reporter #4
 Keith Ferguson as Gangster #1
 Nolan North as Clark Kent / Superman, Police Officer #2

Dick Grayson / Nightwing, Alfred Pennyworth, Barbara Gordon, Harley Quinn (as Harleen Quinzel), Black Mask, Riddler, Cheetah, and Lex Luthor make non-speaking cameo appearances. Wonder Woman and Flash also appear in non-speaking cameos but are only partially visible.

Production
Batman: The Animated Series alumni Kevin Conroy (Batman) and Mark Hamill (the Joker) teased producing an animated adaptation of A Death in the Family during a panel at Canada's Fan Expo in 2016. The interactive film based on the comic was released on October 13, 2020 which also serves as a follow-up to the film Batman: Under the Red Hood with the cast from the latter film reprising their roles (with the exception of Jensen Ackles as Red Hood, leaving Vincent Martella to portray him all throughout).

References

External links
 
 Batman: Death in The Family from DC Wiki

2020 action films
2020 animated films
2020 direct-to-video films
2020 films
2020 short films
2020s American animated films
2020s animated superhero films
2020s direct-to-video animated superhero films
2020s Warner Bros. animated short films
American adult animated films
Animated Batman films
Animated films about revenge
Animated superhero films
American vigilante films
DC Showcase
Films directed by Brandon Vietti
Interactive films
Red Hood
Resurrection in film
Robin (character) films
Short films based on DC Comics
Warner Bros. Animation animated short films
Warner Bros. direct-to-video animated films
2020s English-language films